Het Mysterie van de Mondscheinsonate  is a 1935 Dutch mystery film directed by Kurt Gerron.

Cast
Louis De Bree	... 	Inspecteur Lund
Louis Saalborn... 	Enrica's man
Wiesje Van Tuinen	... 	Enrica
Ank van der Moer	... 	Vrouw van taxichauffeur
Enny Meunier	... 	Lucie Maerlant
Annie Verhulst	... 	Katharina
Darja Collin	... 	Yva, Sascha's partner
Bill Benders	... 	Taxichauffeur
Raoul de Bock	... 	Zoontje taxichauffeur
Charles Braakensiek		
Claire Claery	... 	Duits dienstmeisje
Paula de Waart		
Harry Dresselhuys	... 	Verloofde van Lucie
Bart Elferink		
Ludzer Eringa		
Egon Karter	... 	Sascha Darinoff
Frans Meermans		
Wim Paauw	... 	Joost Maerlant
Johan Schilthuyzen

External links 
 

1935 films
Dutch black-and-white films
1935 mystery films
1930s Dutch-language films